KCHN (1050 AM) is a Houston, Texas, area radio station, licensed to Brookshire, Texas serving mostly Asian listeners with broadcasts in a mix of Indian, Chinese, Mandarin, Vietnamese and Pakistani languages. Sports programming includes coverage of Houston Rockets games. The station also provides religious programs in Polish. It broadcasts on AM frequency 1050 kHz and is under ownership of Multicultural Broadcasting.

History
Originally licensed to Liberty, Texas in 1967 as KPXE. In 1990, Trinity River Valley Broadcasting built an FM facility and started on (the current KHIH) as of aug, 29, 1991, the 24 hour FM sister to KPXE. KPXE was sold to Arthur Liu in 1997, which included the move of the facility to Brookshire, as a station targeting the southwestern and western areas of Houston, which have a significant Asian populace.
 
Because KCHN shares the same frequency as "clear channel" station XEG-AM in Monterrey, Nuevo León, Mexico; it broadcasts only during the daytime hours.

Kalakkal Kadambam, Kannada Karunji, Andhra Mirchi, and Tamil Mirchi programs are aired from KCHN on Saturdays.

Texas Chinese Radio (德州中文台) program is aired from KCHN on Monday through Friday from 7a.m. to 12p.m.

Texas Chinese Radio  (德州中文台) moved from KCHN to its sister station KXYZ in 2017 and on knth?

External links
KCHN official website
Texas State Government list of Houston-area radio stations

Asian-American culture in Houston
Polish-American culture in Texas
CHN
Sports radio stations in the United States
Radio stations established in 1997
Multicultural Broadcasting stations
CHN
Waller County, Texas